Micael dos Santos Silva (born 12 August 2000) is a Brazilian professional footballer who plays as a centre-back for Major League Soccer club Houston Dynamo.

Career
Born in Presidente Prudente, São Paulo, Micael began his playing career at Limeira-based clubs Internacional and Independente. In 2019, he joined the youth academy of Atlético Mineiro, winning in the following year the Campeonato Brasileiro Sub-20 title.

On 9 December 2021, Micael made his professional debut in a Campeonato Brasileiro Série A 4–3 away defeat to Grêmio.

On 27 April 2022, Micael joined Houston Dynamo 2, the reserve team of the MLS side, on a season-long loan. On 13 August, he made his MLS debut for the first team in a 3–2 defeat to CF Montréal.

Career statistics

Honours
Atlético Mineiro
Campeonato Brasileiro Série A: 2021
Copa do Brasil: 2021
Campeonato Mineiro: 2021, 2022
Supercopa do Brasil: 2022
Campeonato Brasileiro Sub-20: 2020

References

External links
 

2000 births
Living people
People from Presidente Prudente, São Paulo
Brazilian footballers
Association football central defenders
Campeonato Brasileiro Série A players
MLS Next Pro players
Major League Soccer players
Clube Atlético Mineiro players
Houston Dynamo FC players
Brazilian expatriate footballers
Brazilian expatriate sportspeople in the United States
Expatriate soccer players in the United States
Footballers from São Paulo (state)